East Midville is a 1982 supplement for Car Wars published by Steve Jackson Games.

Gameplay
East Midville is a supplement which expands the town of Midville, Ohio, that was originally presented in the supplement Sunday Drivers.

Reception
Craig Sheeley reviewed East Midville in The Space Gamer No. 70. Sheeley commented that "East Midville is a real bargain for the price, and the extra counters make it worth buying. And if you can find a 4' x 6' table to put them on, combine the maps from East Midville and Sunday Drivers for a mass shootout and running gunfight of epic proportions."

GeekDad commended this expansion for "providing even more areas ripe for destruction."

References

Car Wars